Ronald George Still (born 10 June 1943) is a Scottish retired professional footballer who played in the Football League for Notts County and Brentford as a centre forward. He top-scored for Notts County in the 1965–66 season.

Career statistics

References

1943 births
Scottish footballers
English Football League players
Brentford F.C. players
Living people
People from Aberdeen
Association football forwards
Notts County F.C. players
Margate F.C. players
Southern Football League players
Arsenal F.C. players